Curt Smith (born September 9, 1986 in Willemstad, Curaçao, in the former Netherlands Antilles) is a Dutch former professional baseball player. He is also a member of the Dutch national team. He was drafted by the St. Louis Cardinals in the 39th round of the 2008 MLB Draft.

Career 
Smith attended the University of Maine at Orono, and hit .403 in his final season as a senior.

St. Louis Cardinals
Smith was selected by the St. Louis Cardinals out of the University of Maine in the 39th round (1,175th overall) of the June 2008 First-Year Player Draft.  At Maine, Smith was named America East Player of the Year in 2008. In 2008, Smith played for the Rookie ball Johnson City Cardinals and the Single-A Quad Cities River Bandits. In 2009, he was assigned to the Single-A advanced Palm Beach Cardinals, and briefly spent time with the Double-A Springfield Cardinals. Smith spent the entire 2010 season with Springfield, and was named a mid-season All-Star. On April 3, 2011, Smith was released by the Cardinals organization. At the time of his release, Smith was a career .301/.336/.457 hitter in 260 minor league games.

Miami Marlins
After spending the remainder of the 2011 season with the Lincoln Saltdogs of the American Association, Smith signed a minor league contract with the Miami Marlins organization on December 16, 2011. After spending the season with the Double-A Jacksonville Suns, batting .261 with 9 home runs in 96 games, Smith elected free agency on November 2, 2012.

Minnesota Twins
On March 15, 2013, Smith signed a minor league contract with the Minnesota Twins organization. After hitting .231/.301/.367 with 4 home runs and 19 RBI in 45 games for the Twins' Double-A affiliate, the New Britain Rock Cats, Smith was released on July 4, 2013.

St. Louis Cardinals (second stint)
After spending the remainder of the 2013 season with the Lincoln Saltdogs, for whom he also played in 2011, Smith signed a minor league contract with his original organization, the St. Louis Cardinals, on January 18, 2014. Smith spent the season with the Double-A Springfield Cardinals, slashing .262/.322/.397 with 11 home runs and 52 RBI in 114 games.

Lincoln Saltdogs
On December 22, 2014, Smith signed with the Lincoln Saltdogs of the American Association of Independent Professional Baseball. In 2015, Smith played in 87 games for Lincoln, posting a .294/.358/.492 slash with 12 home runs and 61 RBI. On July 31, 2016, Smith re-signed with the Saltdogs for his fourth season with the team. He played in 82 games, posting a .331/.403/.548 batting line with 17 home runs and 60 RBI. For the 2017 season, Smith played in 95 games for Lincoln, slashing .322/.424/.474 with 11 home runs and 62 RBI. On December 21, 2017, Smith again re-signed with the Saltdogs. In 2018, Smith logged a .315/.367/.548 batting line with 18 home runs and 74 RBI in 92 games. In 2019, Smith appeared in 95 games for the Saltdogs, recording a .288/.344/.465 slash line with 14 home runs and 58 RBI.

On November 25, 2019, Smith once again re-signed with the Saltdogs, however he did not play in 2020 due to the COVID-19 pandemic.  On February 10, 2021, Smith rejoined the Saltdogs for the 2021 season, his eighth season with the club. In a July 4 game against the Kansas City Monarchs, Smith hit a 2-run home run that made him become the all-time
home run leader in franchise history. The shot was his 91st home run with the Saltdogs. He finished the season batting .280/.363/.480 with 10 home runs and 51 RBIs over 88 games. Smith retired from professional baseball following the season on October 19, 2021.

International career
Smith was named MVP after the 2011 Baseball World Cup. He played for Team Netherlands in the 2019 European Baseball Championship, and at the Africa/Europe 2020 Olympic Qualification tournament in Italy in September 2019.

References

External links

1986 births
2009 World Baseball Classic players
2013 World Baseball Classic players
2015 WBSC Premier12 players
2016 European Baseball Championship players
2017 World Baseball Classic players
2019 European Baseball Championship players
Curaçao baseball players
Curaçao expatriate baseball players in the United States
Jacksonville Suns players
Johnson City Cardinals players
Lincoln Saltdogs players
Living people
Maine Black Bears baseball players
New Britain Rock Cats players
Palm Beach Cardinals players
People from Willemstad
Quad Cities River Bandits players
Springfield Cardinals players
Venados de Mazatlán players
Curaçao expatriate baseball players in Mexico
Curaçao expatriate baseball players in Nicaragua